Cameron Brodeur (born April 25, 2002) is a Canadian actor, most noted for his recurring role as Young Luther Hargreeves in The Umbrella Academy on Netflix. He also gained recognition after playing the supporting role of Sully Brown in Midway, which marked his first theatrical appearance. He was nominated at the Young Artist Awards for Best Performance in a Feature Film by a Teen Artist and Best Performance in a Streaming Series by a Teen Artist, and won that same category the year prior. He also won Best Television Ensemble and Best Actor in a Recurring Role at The Joey Awards.

Life and career 
Cameron Brodeur was born in Montreal, Quebec, to French parents, but is fluent in both English and his mother tongue. Cameron started to pursue acting at the age of 10, and made his on-screen debut portraying Soren in the second series of Helix. Since, Cameron has starred in Amber Alert (2016), Amélie et Compagnie (2017-2019), Ghostwriter (2019), and Midway (2019).

Cameron's most recent project is portraying young Luther in The Umbrella Academy on Netflix. He won the Teen Actor in a Streaming Series category at the Young Artist Awards in 2019, and was nominated for two other awards for that same project.

Filmography

Film

Television

Awards and nominations

References

External links 
 
 Cameron Brodeur on Instagram

2002 births
Canadian male film actors
Canadian male television actors
Living people
21st-century Canadian male actors